Douglas Ross Lockhart (born 19 January 1976) is a Scottish cricketer. He is a right-handed batsman and wicket-keeper.

He has played well over 100 times for the Scotland national team, making his debut in a match against the MCC on 23 August 1995. His One Day International debut for Scotland was against Pakistan on 27 June 2006.

In addition to playing for Scotland, he has also played for the Derbyshire second XI, Oxford University, and one match for the Durham University cricket team.

Outside of cricket, Lockhart worked in the investment industry.

References

External links

Scotland One Day International cricketers
Scottish cricketers
Oxford University cricketers
People educated at the Glasgow Academy
Alumni of Durham University
Alumni of Keble College, Oxford
1976 births
Living people
Commonwealth Games competitors for Scotland
Cricketers at the 1998 Commonwealth Games
Cricketers at the 2007 Cricket World Cup
Cricketers from Glasgow
Wicket-keepers